The Conor McGurk Cup is an annual hurling competition organised by the Ulster Council of the Gaelic Athletic Association. It has been held annually since 2018.

The series of games are played during January. The McGurk Cup is effectively a pre-season tournament, allowing teams to experiment prior to the opening of the National Hurling League.

The 2019 competition, the third year of the event, involved nine teams competing in three sections. The 2022 tournament involved seven teams, including both county teams and college teams.

The Antrim county hurling team won the 2021 competition, and Down won in 2022.

Teams 
As of 2023 the competition involved 10 teams, including:

List of finals

Roll of honour

References

Hurling competitions in Ulster